The 2019–20 Munster Rugby season was Munster's nineteenth season competing in the Pro14, alongside which they also competed in the European Rugby Champions Cup. It was Johann van Graan's third season as head coach.

Events
Backs coach Felix Jones and forwards coach Jerry Flannery left the province when their contracts expired in June 2019. Graham Rowntree joined the province as their new forwards coach after the completion of his duties with Georgia at the 2019 Rugby World Cup. Stephen Larkham, attack coach for the Australian national team, also joined the province as a senior coach ahead of the 2019–20 season.

Club legend and head of commercial and marketing, Doug Howlett, also left the province to return to New Zealand in the summer of 2019, ending his 11-year association with Munster. Munster's CEO Garrett Fitzgerald retired upon reaching retirement age in June 2019. Fitzgerald was Munster's first CEO and had been in the post since 1999, making him the longest serving provincial chief executive in Irish rugby at the time. Ian Flanagan, who was born in Cork and previously worked at Leicester City F.C, was appointed to replace Fitzgerald.

In a change from the previous two seasons, Munster were in conference B for the 2019–20 Pro14 season, alongside Benetton, Cardiff Blues, Connacht, Edinburgh, Scarlets and Southern Kings. This will also be the case for the 2020–21 season, and the change was made based on the points total each club achieved after the completion of the regular 2018–19 season.

Munster opened their 2019–20 Pro14 season with a 39–9 home victory against Welsh side Dragons on 28 September 2019, with the tries coming from Arno Botha, Jack O'Donoghue, Man-of-the-Match Shane Daly, Tyler Bleyendaal and academy member Diarmuid Barron, and fly-half JJ Hanrahan contributing 14 points off the kicking tee. New signing Nick McCarthy and academy members Keynan Knox and Jack O'Sullivan all made their senior competitive debuts for the province, and hooker Kevin O'Byrne won his 50th cap. Short-term signing Jed Holloway made his debut for the province in their 31–20 away win against South African side Southern Kings on 5 October 2019.

In the opening two rounds of the 2019–20 Champions Cup, Munster beat Welsh Pro14 rivals Ospreys 32–13 away from home on 16 November 2019, with tries from Jeremy Loughman, Keith Earls, Andrew Conway and James Cronin and twelve points off the kicking tee from Tyler Bleyendaal, before drawing 21–21 at home against French side Racing 92 on 23 November 2019; Munster's tries came from Keith Earls and Andrew Conway, and JJ Hanrahan contributed eleven points with the boot. The draw was Munster's first at home in the Champions Cup, against a Racing side that included former Munster players Donnacha Ryan and Simon Zebo in their starting XV.

Prop Stephen Archer won his 200th cap for Munster in their 2019–20 Pro14 round 7 fixture against Edinburgh on 29 November 2019, becoming the eleventh player to achieve the accolade for the province. Academy fly-half Ben Healy made his debut for Munster during the same game, scoring 11 points in the 18–16 defeat to the Scottish side.

In the Champions Cup back-to-backs against defending champions Saracens, Munster won 10–3 at home on 7 December 2019, with the English side picking up a losing bonus point. In the return fixture one week later, Munster were beaten 15–6, with two tries in the final quarter securing the win for Saracens and denying Munster a losing bonus point.

Following an incident that triggered a large brawl in Munster's second fixture against Saracens in December 2019 and a complaint to the EPCR from Saracens, in which Munster team doctor Jamie Kearns was accused of verbally abusing Saracens hooker Jamie George, an independent panel upheld the complaint and found that Kearns had breached the EPCR's disciplinary rules, handing Kearns a three-week ban, suspended for 12 months, and a fine of €2,000 to be paid immediately.

Munster went into their round 5 Champions Cup clash away to Racing 92 on 12 January 2020 knowing that they had to win to keep alive their hopes of progressing to the quarter-finals of the tournament, but despite leading the French club with ten minutes to go, late tries from Racing secured a 39–22 win for the home side. Munster needed results elsewhere to go their way if they were to stand any chance of qualifying for the quarter-finals as the final round of pool matches took place, but Glasgow Warriors 45–7 win against Sale Sharks ended those hopes before Munster's final game against Ospreys had even taken place. In the event, Munster won 33–6 against Ospreys, with Craig Casey, who made his European debut for the province in the defeat to Racing, scoring his first try for Munster, and Calvin Nash, Jack O'Sullivan and Ben Healy making their European debuts for the province.

Munster's 68–3 win against South African side Southern Kings in round 11 of the Pro14 on 14 February 2020 was a record margin of victory for the province in the competition, and the ten tries scored also set a new record for the province. Academy member John Hodnett made his debut for Munster in the fixture, scoring a try and earning the Man-of-the-Match award. The match had an added poignancy for Munster, as their long-serving former CEO, Garrett Fitzgerald, who had only retired in June 2019, died following a battle with illness earlier that day.

The 2019–20 Pro14 was suspended indefinitely by tournament organisers on 12 March 2020 in response to the ongoing coronavirus pandemic. Munster's round 14 and 15 fixtures against Italian side Benetton had already been postponed. Tyler Bleyendaal was forced to retire from playing rugby with immediate effect in May 2020 due to a persistent neck injury. In the same month, prop Brian Scott was also forced to retire with immediate effect due to injury. The regular season resumed on 22 August 2020, with the number of rounds reduced from 21 to 15 and any games postponed prior to the indefinite suspension of the season being deemed as 0–0 draws and both teams awarded two points. Rounds 14 and 15 took place as derbies in each territory, with the top two teams in each conference progressing to a semi-final stage.

Munster resumed their season on 22 August 2020 with a fixture against Leinster in the Aviva Stadium, which Leinster won 27–25. Munster handed debuts to new signings Damian de Allende and RG Snyman, though Snyman's first appearance for the province lasted only 7 minutes after he was injured during a lineout. Andrew Conway scored tries either side of Keith Earls' try, with JJ Hanrahan kicking 10 points off the tee, and Chris Farrell won the Man-of-the-Match award.

Munster completed their reduced 15 round Pro14 regular season with a seven try 49–12 win against Connacht, a victory that secured a semi-final against defending champions and provincial rivals Leinster on 4 September 2020. The tries came from Chris Cloete, Jeremy Loughman, Tadhg Beirne, James Cronin, two from Andrew Conway and a penalty try, with JJ Hanrahan kicking all five of his conversions and Rory Scannell converting the final try. As well as getting on the scoresheet, Tadhg Beirne also won the Man-of-the-Match award on his first game back after fracturing an ankle against Saracens in December 2019. Leinster won the semi-final 13–3, knocking Munster out at the semi-final stage of the Pro14 for the third season in a row and bringing an end to Munster's 2019–20 season.

A total of 51 players were used during the marathon season, with seven academy members earning minutes for the province: Diarmuid Barron, Liam Coombes, Jake Flannery, Ben Healy, John Hodnett, Keynan Knox and Jack O'Sullivan. Healy and O'Sullivan also made their Champions Cups debuts during the season, alongside senior players Craig Casey, Shane Daly and Calvin Nash. Stephen Archer surpassed the 200-cap mark for the province, with John Ryan winning his 150th cap, Niall Scannell his 100th and Dan Goggin his 50th. Aside from squad captain Peter O'Mahony, Billy Holland, Jack O'Donoghue, Tommy O'Donnell, Niall Scannell and CJ Stander also captained the province. Rory Scannell made the most appearances during the season with 21, and also played the most minutes (1,276). JJ Hanrahan was the top points scorer with 171, and Andrew Conway was the top try scorer with 8.

Munster's home game against Leinster in December 2019 was a record-equalling attendance for Thomond Park, with additional seating bumping the crowd up to 26,267. All three of Munster's home Champions Cup fixtures were the highest attendances for their respective rounds.

Internationally, 12 Munster players represented Ireland at the 2019 Rugby World Cup: Tadhg Beirne, Joey Carbery, Andrew Conway, Keith Earls, Chris Farrell, Dave Kilcoyne, Jean Kleyn, Conor Murray, Peter O'Mahony, John Ryan, Niall Scannell and CJ Stander. Conway, Earls, Kilcoyne, Murray, O'Mahony and Stander also featured for Ireland in the 2020 Six Nations Championship. Three Munster players also represented Ireland under-20s in the Under-20s Six Nations: Tom Ahern, Jack Crowley and Ciaran Ryan.

At the delayed end of season awards in November 2020, Jack O'Sullivan won the John McCarthy Award for Academy Player of the Year, Shane Daly won the Young Player of the Year award and CJ Stander won Player of the Year for a third time, whilst Garrett Fitzgerald, Munster's former CEO who died in February 2020, was inducted into Munster's Hall of Fame.

Coaching and management staff

Players

Senior squad

Academy squad

Senior team transfers

Unlike previous seasons, where the majority of transfers take place during the summer pre-season, the 2019–20 season was unusual in that it had two separate periods of transfer activity due to the mid-season break in response to the COVID-19 pandemic. Players scheduled to join clubs ahead of the commencement of the 2020–21 season where instead able to join their new club during this break, meaning they were available for the completion of the 2019–20 season.

October 2018 – May 2020

Players in
 Gavin Coombes promoted from Academy
 Shane Daly promoted from Academy
 Nick McCarthy from  Leinster
 Seán O'Connor promoted from Academy
 Craig Casey promoted from Academy
 Jed Holloway from  Waratahs (Two-month contract)

Players out
 Stephen Fitzgerald to  Connacht
 Jaco Taute to  Leicester Tigers
 Duncan Williams released
 Bill Johnston to  Ulster
 James Hart to  Biarritz
 Dave O'Callaghan to  Biarritz
 Mike Sherry retired
 Alby Mathewson released
 Tyler Bleyendaal retired
 Brian Scott retired

February 2019 – July 2020

Players in
 Keynan Knox promoted from Academy
 Liam Coombes promoted from Academy
 Alex McHenry promoted from Academy
 Jack O'Sullivan promoted from Academy
 Damian de Allende from  Panasonic Wild Knights
 Matt Gallagher from  Saracens
 RG Snyman from  Honda Heat
 Roman Salanoa from  Leinster
 Diarmuid Barron promoted from Academy

Players out
 Arno Botha to  Bulls
 Sammy Arnold to  Connacht
 Conor Oliver to  Connacht
 Seán O'Connor to  Jersey Reds
 Ciaran Parker to  Jersey Reds
 Alex Wootton to  Connacht (season-long loan)
 Darren O'Shea to  Vannes

Pre-season

2019–20 Pro14

Round 1

Round 2

Round 3

Round 4

Round 5

Round 6

Round 7

Round 8

Round 9

Round 10

Round 11

Round 12

Round 13

Round 14

Round 15

Semi-final

2019–20 European Rugby Champions Cup

Munster were seeded in tier 2 when the draw for the 2019–20 European Rugby Champions Cup was made in Lausanne, Switzerland on Wednesday 19 June 2019, and were drawn in pool 4 alongside defending champions Saracens, Racing 92, who count former Munster players Donnacha Ryan and Simon Zebo amongst their squad, and fellow Pro14 side Ospreys.

Round 1

Round 2

Round 3

Round 4

Round 5

Round 6

2019–20 Munster A season

2019–20 Celtic Cup

In a change from the 2018–19 tournament, the 2019–20 edition of the Celtic Cup featured all eight teams in a single league, rather than two conferences, with each team playing seven matches and the top two teams advancing to a final on 12 October 2019. Munster A finished 6th in the tournament with 13 points, 2 wins, 1 draw and 4 defeats.

Round 1

Round 2

Round 3

Round 4

Round 5

Round 6

Round 7

Friendlies

Challenge Match

Annual Ireland U20 match

Interpro

Notes

References

External links

2019-20
2019–20 Pro14 by team
2019–20 in Irish rugby union
2019–20 European Rugby Champions Cup by team